Joe Riley Gledhill (16 June 1882 – 28 February 1950) was an English professional rugby league footballer who played in the 1890s, 1900s and 1910s, and coached rugby union in the 1910s and 1920s.

Background
Riley was born on 16 June 1882 in Sowerby Bridge, West Riding of Yorkshire. For most of his non-rugby life, he worked for Smith, Bulmer & Co., a textile business based in Holmfield. Riley died on 28 February 1950, aged 67. His funeral took place at Sowerby Bridge cemetery.

Playing career

International honours
Riley won caps for England while at Halifax in 1910 against Wales, in 1911 against Australia, and won caps for Great Britain while at Halifax on the 1910 Great Britain Lions tour of Australia and New Zealand against Australia and Australasia.

County Honours
Riley won caps for Yorkshire while at Halifax.

Challenge Cup Final appearances
Joe Riley played  in Halifax's 7-0 victory over Salford in the 1902–03 Challenge Cup Final during the 1902–03 season at Headingley Rugby Stadium, Leeds on Saturday 25 April 1903, in front of a crowd of 32,507, and he played right-, and scored a try in the 8-3 victory over Warrington in the 1903–04 Challenge Cup Final during the 1903–04 season at The Willows, Salford on Saturday 30 April 1904, in front of a crowd of 17,041.

Club career
Riley made his début for Halifax on Saturday 7 September 1901, he suffered a badly broken leg in the match against Bradford Northern on Saturday 2 January 1915, this fracture ended his rugby league playing career.

Testimonial match
A testimonial match at Halifax was shared by Joe Riley, and Asa Robinson at Thrum Hall, Halifax in 1920. 20,000 people attended the match, and Riley received a cheque for £400.

Honoured at Halifax
Riley is a Halifax Hall of Fame inductee.

References

External links

1882 births
1950 deaths
England national rugby league team players
English rugby league players
English rugby union coaches
Great Britain national rugby league team players
Halifax R.L.F.C. players
Halifax RUFC coaches
People from Sowerby Bridge
Place of death missing
Rugby league centres
Rugby league five-eighths
Rugby league halfbacks
Yorkshire rugby league team players